Jaruma (Aymara jaru bitter, uma water, "bitter water") is a  mountain in the Bolivian Andes. It is located in the Potosí Department, Daniel Campos Province, Llica Municipality. Jaruma lies between the Uyuni salt flat in the east and the Napa salt flat in the west. The highest neighboring mountains are Mancha in the south-east and Thuwa in the south. The smaller mountain at the south-western slope of Jaruma is named Wiraqucha Qullu (Huirajocha Kkollu).

References 

Mountains of Potosí Department